The 1974 Maureen Connolly Brinker International was a women's tennis tournament played on indoor hardcourts at the Brookhaven Country Club in Dallas, Texas that was part of the 1974 USLTA Women's Circuit. It was the third edition of the tournament, held from March 5 through March 10, 1974. First-seeded Chris Evert won the singles title and earned $10,000 first-prize money.

Finals

Singles
 Chris Evert defeated  Virginia Wade 7–5, 6–2
 It was Evert's third singles title of the year and the 26th of her career.

Doubles
 Isabel Fernández de Soto /  Martina Navratilova defeated  Karen Krantzcke /  Virginia Wade 6–3, 3–6, 6–3

Prize money

References

Virginia Slims of Dallas
Virginia Slims of Dallas
1974 in sports in Texas
Dallas
Dallas
Maureen Connolly Brinker International